Putin's Progress is a biography written by Peter Truscott about Russian president Vladimir Putin's rise to power. The book was published in January 2004 by New York-based publishers Simon & Schuster. The book deals mainly with Putin's childhood, education, involvement with the KGB/FSB, rise to power, and the first few years of his presidency.

The book is rated 3.7 out of 5 stars on Goodreads' website by 72 users.

References

2004 non-fiction books
Books about Vladimir Putin
Books about post-Soviet Russia
Simon & Schuster books